The Ku-ring-gai Philharmonic Orchestra (abbreviation – KPO) is an amateur community orchestra located in New South Wales, Australia. The orchestra was founded in 1971 by conductor Helen Quach.  The current artistic director is Paul Terracini.

The Orchestras of Australia Network voted the KPO as Australia's Community Orchestra of the Year in 2002, 2004 and 2007.

The KPO hosts the New South Wales Secondary Schools Concerto Competition (a competition which now attracts entries from around 100 of the state's musicians) and a series of Kids' Proms and free community concerts.

External links
Official Website

References

Australian orchestras
New South Wales musical groups
Musical groups established in 1971
1971 establishments in Australia